George Thomas Kruse (2 February 1880 – 30 March 1965) was an Australian rules footballer who played with Fitzroy.

References

External links

1880 births
1965 deaths
Fitzroy Football Club players
Footscray Football Club (VFA) players
Australian rules footballers from Victoria (Australia)